The Platte River Bridge is the second of three pedestrian bridges to connect Downtown Denver with the Highland neighborhood.  

The cable-stayed bridge crosses the South Platte River between Commons Park and Commons West Apartments along the former 16th street viaduct.

See also
Denver Millennium Bridge
Highland Bridge

External links
Denverinfill.com Central Platte Valley District
"Platte River Pedestrian Bridge - Denver, CO" Waymark
Platte River Pedestrian Bridge by Google - Google 3D Warehouse

Cable-stayed bridges in the United States
Pedestrian bridges in Colorado
Transportation buildings and structures in Denver